Barbara Carle is a French-American poet, critic, translator and Italianist. She is currently a professor of Italian at Sacramento State University.

Writing 
Barbara Carle has published several books of poetry in the U.S. and Italy. Most of her books are bilingual (English/Italian).

She authored numerous articles on Italian and French poetry, and prefaced various volumes of translation.

Her work appeared in various European anthologies.

Biography 
Born to American and French parents in Peshawar, Pakistan, she spent most her childhood and adolescence abroad (Pakistan, Colombia, India, Bangladesh, Iran, Thailand, Libya, France, Italy) as she grew up in a diplomatic family.

She obtained a doctorate in Italian Literature with specializations in French and Comparative Literature at Columbia University, New York City in 1988. Her dissertation was on Giuseppe Ungaretti and Paul Valéry.

Creative works 
Touching What Remains/Toccare quello che resta, Poesie in inglese e in italiano, Seconda edizione, Ghenomena Poesia 9, 2021, 150 pp., with a postface by Domenico Adriano.

Sulle orme di Circe Incontri a Formia Ghenomena Edizioni, May 2016.

Tangible Remains/Toccare quello che resta Ghenomena Edizioni, May 2009.

New Life/ Nuova vita, Gradiva Publications, SUNY at Stony Brook, New York, May 2006 (Poetry and prose). This book was selected in the Recommended Reading section in Chelsea 82/83 2007 : 292–293.

Don't Waste My Beauty/ Non guastare la mia bellezza (bilingual collection of Poetry), Caramanica (Italy), July 2006, (National Frascati Prize, Foreign Section “Italo Alighiero Chiusano,” 2000), pp. 104.

About Touching What Remains/Toccare quello che resta (Ghenomena, 2021) 

This new edition of Tangible Remains/Toccare quello che resta (2009) includes a revised selection of the original sequence. Most of the poems have been rewritten in both languages. The book is entirely reorganized. It includes new poems (such as "Window I/Finestra I", "Clepsydra"/"La clessidra"). Seven poems from the first edition have been excluded from this new collection. However, they have been moved to the Appendix, which also includes a new poem entitled "The Rag"/"Lo straccio".
The 2021 edition includes an updated postface by Domenico Adriano.

Sample Poem 
The Last Green God
An old man disguised as a rugged king
bizarre to the point of appearing dead
so racked, weather beaten, and contorted
hunchbacked, wizened, wrinkled and distorted
uneven, battle-scarred, seasoned and tough
designed by time’s release of swirls and grooves
disjointed, crinkled, deeply furrowed, rough
askew with thorough dissonant strength
inclined to stay beyond the human reign
he still raises his majestic silver mane
reflects on his contemplative wood pillar
sustains the glowing green of olive fruit
solicits the sunlight to boast his truth.

L’ultimo nume verde
Un vecchio travestito da reale
bizzarro appare persino morto
tanto è urtato ammaccato contorto
increspato globoso surreale
grinzoso, battuto, sofferto, eroso
tutto bernoccoli e protuberanze
nodi e macchie, sgualcito e rugoso
ripiegato con strane dissonanze
ricurvo inclinato radicalmente
ma alza la criniera maestosa
lucente sul tronco contemplativo
storto per essere ultra resistente
mediterraneo genitore ulivo
l’ultimo nume verde ancora vivo.
Note: For Carle, translating became writing between languages, a tool for rereading and revising her poems. The two texts above are a good example of parallel writing between languages. This is derived from translation but ultimately detached from it to create a new interlinguistic form of composition.

Art books 
La ladra, poem with one original engraving by André Beuchat, I quaderni della notte, 9, Atelier Alma Charta, Parma, 2020.

Voices from the Northerner, with original etchings by André Beuchat, Atelier Alma Charta, Parma, Italia, 2019.

Gattizie, with one original etching by the author and five new poems in French, Italian, and English. Cover etching and book fabrication by Luciano Ragozzino, Il ragazzo innocuo Press, Milan (Italy), November, 2018.

Chi può dirtelo amore Tutto il segno Can anyone find words my love to express the sign, by Marco Vitale and B. Carle, with an original etching by André Beuchat, L’Atelier ALMA CHARTA, Toccalmatto, Italy, February, 2018 (Limited Edition).

Short Selection of Poems published in Journals and Anthologies 
Invettiva mancata, Piccolo omaggio a Dante Alighieri / Failed Invective, A Little Homage to Dante Alighieri in Pianeta Poesia, Accademia Mondiale della Poesia, numero 3, marzo, 2021: 6–7.

"La ladra", "Still LIfe with Teapot", "Il bricco avventuriero", "Elevata tra due cerchi", Gradiva, International Journal of Italian Poetry, Number 58, Fall 2020: 21-24

Dicesi amore, poesie di Barbara Carle, New Poems, Incroci, Fall, 2020, semestrale di letteratura e altre scritture anno XXI, numero 41 gennaio-giugno 2020: 7–14.

“L'ultimo nume verde”, ””, edited by Flavia Pankiewicz, Luoghi Interiori, Città di Castello, 2020.

“Il mare bianco, The White Sea” in Maremare, Antologia Poetica Mediterranea, Anthology of Mediterranean Poets, Ed. by Lino Angiuli, Maria Rosaria Cesareo, Milica Marinkovic’, Adda Editore, June, 2017, pp. 116–117.

“Gli spazzini di Roma” in Novecento non più – Verso il realismo terminale, Anthology of poetry, ed. by Salvatore Contessini and Diana Battaggia, with Introduction by Guido Oldani, La Vita Felice, Milano, November 2016, p. 81.

“Lorenzo Lotto: L’annunciata di Recanati,” “Cortilofilia 3” in “Sulla diaspora della poesia italiana,” Poesia 310, December, 2015, International Monthly Magazine of Poetry, Milano, Italy: 55–56.

“The Pharos of Dover/ Il faro di Dover” in Luoghi d’Europa Antologia poetica internazionale, ed. by Lino Angiuli, Diana Battaggia, La Vita Felice, 2015: 58–63.

“I. Bici II. Vélo Love” in Parole in Bicicletta, Bicicletterario 2015, Caramanica, Italy, 2015: 12–13.

“Voices From the Northerner 1860/ Voci dalla Northerner 1860,” Narrative Poem in English and in Italian with an introduction, Journal of Italian Translation, Vol. IX, Numbers 1 & 2, Spring and Fall, 2014: 152-171

“Dialogue at the Cestian Field in Rome/ Dialogo al campo Cestio di Roma,” Italian Poetry Review, 2013, VIII (Publication: October 2014) (A peer reviewed multilingual journal of creative writing and criticism, New York City): 132–137.

“The Grains of Sand,” Chelsea 72 (New York City, September 2002):125,  “Your Shell Which Wakes,” Chelsea 72: 126 “Downpour Over the Forest,” Chelsea 72: 127 “During My Bengali Adolescence,” Chelsea 72: 128 “Love Keeps Disquieting Me,” Chelsea 72: 129, “Unmake the Silence,” Chelsea 72:130, “They Breathe, They Listen,” Chelsea 72:131

“Pencil,” Connecticut River Review, Vol. 12/1 (The Connecticut Poetry Society, Fall/Winter 1990): 13.

Interviews with Carle on her creative works 
Erinda Islami intervista Barbara Carle, Insula europea, September, 2017 Erinda Islami intervista Barbara Carle

Video Interview by Federica Velonà, Rai Letteratura, June, 2017 

Interview by Marco Vitale with Barbara Carle on Sulle orme di Circe on Insula europea Website (sponsored by the University of Perugia) Sulle orme di Circe. Marco Vitale intervista Barbara Carle

Anthologies and Translations with Critical Introductions 
Introductory notes by Loredana Capone and Maria Rosaria Cesareo.Translator's Preface and Translation by Barbara Carle. Poems selected by Maria Rosaria Cesareo and Barbara Carle. Consiglio regionale della Puglia, Edizioni di Pagina, Bari, 2021.

Emblems of Sleep and Other Poems, by Marco Vitale, Gradiva Publications Video presentation with Marco Vitale, 2020

Tra il cielo e la terra/ Between Heaven and Earth: Poesie in cinese classico, inglese e italiano/ Poems in the Classical Chinese, English and Italian, Trilingual Anthology of Classical Chinese Poetry (with Curtis Dean Smith), La Vita Felice, Milano, June 2017, pp. 220. Second revised edition, June 2019

November, by Domenico Cipriano with critical introduction, Gradiva Publications, Stony Brook, New York, 2015.

Garden of Delights, Selected Poems by Gianfranco Palmery, with a critical introduction, Gradiva Publications, SUNY at Stony Brook, New York, May 2010.

Editor of bilingual Italian/English volume, translation with critical introduction, Gradiva Publications, May 1998.

Translation of books (poetry and fiction) 
Niobe (poetic tale) by Rodolfo Di Biasio, first bilingual edition, Ghenomena, 2022, pp. 60.

Per una gentile compagna di viaggio, Dodici omaggi a Nancy Watkins tradotti da Barbara Carle, May 2017, Fàmmera Edizioni, pp. 44.

Liturgia familiare Family Liturgy, translation of a book of poetry by Tommaso Lisi, Edizioni Il Labirinto, Rome (Italy), May, 2015, pp 76.

Laudes creaturarum (Cantico di Frate Sole by San Francesco d’Assisi), translation in English, Sol Invictus Press, Special Edition (Vandercook Press), Drawings by Stefan C. Arteni, Design by Myriam S.P. De Arteni, New York, 1992.

Translation of poetry into English and French 

Bambina mattina by Domenico Adriano, Co-translation (with Michel Sirvent) of poetry into English and French, Ghenomena Editions (Italy), August 2013 (Rare limited edition), pp. 82.  Available in Digital Library, University of North Texas

Available in Digital Library, University of North Texas

Interview on Translation 
Interview – Review “Tradurre non è tradire:”  interviews Marco Vitale and Barbara Carle in America Oggi Magazine, September 6, 2020: 7.

Translation of poetry into Italian 
B. Carle regularly contributes to Journal of Italian Translation (JIT) with translations from English into Italian. She has translated poems by Ralph Waldo Emerson, Greg Delaney, T.S. Eliot, Rachel Hadas, and Marianne Moore into Italian. She has also contributed many translations of contemporary and modern Italian poets into English, several translated into English for the first time, such as Lucio Zinna and Marco Vitale (Journal of Italian Translation/)

"La nuvola,Traduzione di Percy Bisshe Shelley, The Cloud", in L'anello che non tiene, Vols. 27–28, n. 1–2, Spring-Fall 2015–2016 (published in 2021): 83–89.

A short selection of Critical Articles on Poetry and Translation 
"L'ariosa riscrittura di P. B. Shelley – Nota sulla traduzione per 'The Cloud- La nuvola'" in L'anello che non tiene, Vols. 27–28, nn. 1–2, Spring-Fall 2015–2016 (published in 2021): 76-82

An Introduction to Paolo Valesio’s Esploratrici solitarie through Twelve Poems, translations with critical commentary and introduction, Italica, Volume 97, No. 2, Summer, 2020, p. 397-412

“Il ritorno e la ripresa nell’opera di Rodolfo di Biasio” in I poeti del centro Italia, Volume primo, ed. by Bonifacio Vincenzi, Francavilla Marittima, Macabor Editore, January, 2019: 33–36.

“Under Mario Luzi’s Poetic Spell,” Introductory essay to Luigi Bonaffini's translation of Under Human Species by Mario Luzi, Legas, New York, 2018: 7–19.

“Su Garden of Delights: Introduzione e Postfazione,” Gradiva, International Journal of Italian Poetry, Number 45, Spring 2014: 48–53.

“Dalle zolle perdute alla finestra: l’identità letteraria dei confini in Lina Galli e Graziana Pentich” in Atti del Convegno su L’esodo giuliano dalmata nella letteratura, Trieste, 28 febbraio-1 marzo, 2013 Fabrizio Serra Editore, Pisa, Roma, 2014: 386–393.

“Viaggio attraverso le rime di Alfonso Gatto: i sonetti,” in a book of essays titled Letteratura e oltre: Studi in onore di Giorgio Baroni, Fabrizio Serra Editore, Pisa, 2012: 68–72.

“The Lexicon of Costellazione anonima: A Paradigmatic Poem” in La potenza della poesia: Alfredo de Palchi, ed. by Roberto Bertoldo Edizioni Dell’Orso, 2008: 51–57.

“Bolaffio e Saba, La consonanza artistica,” in Rivista di letteratura italiana, XXVI, 2–3, 2008: 61–69. This article was quoted two times by Daniele D’Anza, Fondazione CRTrieste (Italy), in his book Vittorio Bolaffio, December 2010: 72 and 277.

“Poiein and Pictura in Alfonso Gatto’s Rime di viaggio per la terra dipinta” (Refereed article), Italica, The Journal of the American Association of Teachers of Italian, Vols. 83–84, Fall/Winter 2006–2007: 489–504.

“The American Editions of Alfredo De Palchi’s Poetry: “The Scorpion’s Dark Dance, Sessions With My Analyst, Anonymous Constellations, Addictive Avversions,” Gradiva, 30, Fall 2006: 12–28.

Critical introductions to the poetry of Antonella Anedda and Gianfranco Palmery in Tre generazioni di poeti italiani. Un’antologia del secondo ‘900 a cura di Francesco De Nicola e Giuliano Manacorda, Caramanica Editore, December 2006: 23-25, 383-395.

On Translating: “From Antoine Berman to Antonia Pozzi”, Binding the Lands Present Day Poets Present Day Poetry, Proceedings of the Third Annual Symposium of IPSA (Italian Poetry Society of America) New York, November 11–13, 1999. Ed. by Alessandro Carrera and Alessandro Vettori, The New Jersey Institute of Italian and Italian American Heritage Studies, Edizioni Cadmo, 2004: 231-236. (REPRINT article was originally published in Polytext).

References

Reviews of Barbara Carle's works

On Sulle orme di Circe 

Franco Borrelli : Magico Mare Nostrum,  America Oggi 7, Weekly Magazine for America Oggi, 8 January 2017.

Marta Lentini in Incroci, XVII, no. 34, luglio-dicembre, 2016: 146-146.

Marco Vitale, Sulle orme di Circe, Poesia, Anno XXXI, 337, Maggio/May, 2018: 78-79.

Interview by Marco Vitale with Barbara Carle on Sulle orme di Circe on Insula europea Website (Sponsored by the University of Perugia):https://web.archive.org/web/20130124190353/http://www.insulaeuropea.eu/

On Tangible Remains/ Toccare quello che resta 
Benassi, Luca, noidonne, Toccare quello che resta Essenzialità di forme come accensione e incandescenza, September, 2011.

Robert Bonazzi in '[https://www.worldliteraturetoday.org/ 'World Literature Today], vol. 84, no. 2, March–April 2010: 721–722.

Franco Borrelli in Oggi 7, Magazine domenicale di America Oggi, 20 settembre 2009, La grandezza del piccolo. This review may also be accessed online through America Oggi’s webpage.

Gina Cafaro in Incroci, luglio dicembre 2009, no. 20: 179.

Francesco Dalessandro in Pagine, agosto-novembre 2009: 46-47 : "Immaginiamo un mondo distrutto, deflagrato; immaginiamo un superstite che s'aggiri, tra le rovine, tra gli oggetti sparsi intorno a sé; immaginiamo che si rivolga a quegli oggetti per ricostruire una memoria possibile della propria vita perduta, e si muova tra di essi affidandosi al tatto, toccandoli, palpandoli, sentendone spigoli o curve, asperità o levigatezza di superfici, la forma intera per ritrovarne memoria in se stesso, alleviando con ciò la propria solitudine. "Anche il tatto ha memoria", dice un verso di Keats. E l'aura che spira in questo libro – tema: gli oggetti "reliquie [...] sopravvissute ai vari crolli delle civiltà". Autrice ne è Barbara Carle, poetessa e traduttrice Americana (al suo attivo versioni da diversi poeti italiani), che da noi si era già messa in luce con un altro libro, Non guastare la mia bellezza (Don't Waste My Beauty, traduzione propria e di Antonella Anedda), pubblicato da Caramanica nel 2006, dopo che nel 2000, aveva vinto il Premio Frascati, 'sezione Italo Alighiero Chiusano'."

Michael Palma in Journal of Italian Translation, 2009, vol. IV, no. 2: 267-271, reprinted in Faithful in My Fashion, Xenos Books/Chelsea, 10/3/2016 :
"As befits a book of objects, Tangible Remains is itself a pleasing object, handsomely printed and designed. Though published in Italy, it is easily available via Internet. Unusual in inspirable and satisfying in execution, it should be read slowly and not all at once, just as you would not tear through a museum giving only the merest glance to each piece on display. And while these pages keep delighting your mind and your ear, you should also keep an eye out for what this always interesting writer will do next".

Simone Pangia in La Provincia (Latina), May 24, 2010, Toccare quello che resta di Barbara Carle pubblicate le poesie, in Rubrica Libri.

Gregory Pell, Tangible Remains/Toccare quello che resta (Poesie in inglese e in italiano), Forum Italicum: A Journal of Italian Studies, September 2009- no. 2, Fall: 535-537 : "This [...] work is equally idiosyncratic and daring."

Giancarlo Pontiggia in Testo, no. 59 anno XXXI gennaio-giugno 2010: 162–163.

Renzo Ricchi in Nuova antologia, May 2010: 367–369.

Rossella Tempesta, Fare Poesia, Rivista di Poesia e Arte Sociale, N. 5 Settembre 2011, p. 127.

Roberto Tortora in TerPress 19 ottobre, 2009. Online article may be accessed at this Blog:La poesia di Barbara Carle. Natura morta in terza personaMarco Vitale, "Enigmi e rammendi, La poesia angloitaliana di Barbara Carle", succedeoggi, cultura nell'informazione quodidiana, 31 agosto, 2021.

Lucio Zinna in Arenaria, Collana di ragguagli di letteratura moderna e contemporarnea, autunno, tre, 2009: 95–96.

 On Don't Waste my Beauty/ Non guastare la mia bellezza 

Luigi Fontanella, Gradiva, 31-31, Spring-Fall 2007: 199. On Don't Waste My Beauty/ Non guastare la mia bellezza.

Tiziana Migliaccio in Dall’alto del Gianicolo vedo i castelli romani Poeti a Frascati 1959–2006, Crocetti Editore (Milan, Italy) 2007: 56–57, 171–172. She wrote : "La poesia della Carle è vetro impastato con carne e sogni, "la gioia della mia polpa/matura mentre aspetto/ che il tuo morso mieta la mia fertilità"; è un luogo custodito da risorte divinità: Dioniso, le Parche". "La sezione "Italo Alighiero Chiusano: dentro il cuore del Premio Frascati" in Dall'alto del Gianicolo vedo i castelli romani, Poeti a Frascati 1959–2006, Crocetti Editore, 2007.

 On New Life/ Nuova Vita 

Gregory Pell, Journal of Italian Translation, Vol. 1, no. 2, 2006: 310-314 (also available on line at: http://userhome.brooklyn.cuny.edu/bonaffini/jit/)

 On both Don't Waste my Beauty/ Non guastare la mia bellezza and Tangible Remains/ Toccare quello che resta 

Giovanni Occhipinti, Barbara Carle: La poesia dell’amore e dell’oggetto in Trasmigrazioni, anno II, n. 2 luglio 2009 2010 (published in 2011), Ragusa, Italy: 92.

Svetlana Tsiberman in Sac State Magazine, Fall 2009.

On Patmos (English version, 1998) by Rodolfo Di BiasioPatmos, edited and translated by Barbara Carle, New York, Gradiva Publications, 1998, 53pp. Paper, $10.00
in Collages & Bricolages, n. 13, 2000. Review by Loretta McNaughton

"Perché un poeta ne traduce un altro" by Cinzia Monti,America Oggi Magazine, Oggi 7, domenica 7 marzo, 1999

"Di Biasio approda in USA/Da Patmos ai versi scelti" by Sandro Gionti, Il Messaggero (di Latina), 7 gennaio, 1999

 On B. Carle's translation (with introductory essay) of Gianfranco Palmery's Garden of Delights 

Alberto Toni in Avanti (Rome, Italy), 14 October 2010, Arcipelago Libri: 6.

 On Anthology of Chinese Poetry Tra il cielo/ Between heaven and Earth 

Thalia Pandiri and Sujane Wu, Metamorphoses, The Journal of the five college faculty seminar on literary translation, Amherst/Northampton, Massachusetts, Vol. 26, Issues 1–2, Spring/Fall 2018: 228–233.

Rob Vollmar, World Literature Today'', Nota Bene, Vol. 91, November, 2017.

Living people
American women poets
1958 births
21st-century American women